"Wisdom of Children" (also translated as Little Girls Wiser than Men) is a short story by Russian author Leo Tolstoy first published in 1885.  It takes the form of a parable about forgiveness.

Synopsis

The story opens at the beginning of Holy Week, when there was still melting snow on the ground.  An older girl, Akulya, and a younger girl, Malasha, go outside to play.  They both have just been given new frocks, but they insist on wading through one of the puddles from the melting snow.  They both take off their shoes to keep them dry, and Akulya warns Malasha against splashing the water on her new frock.  Malasha splashes Akulya despite her warning, and Akulya runs home in tears.  Her mother is furious at the ruined frock, and she spanks Malasha in the middle of the street.  Soon Malasha's mother emerges from her home, and the mothers begin arguing.  The shouts brought the peasants into the street, who also begin arguing with each other.  The peasants start pushing each other, and Akulya's grandmother urges everyone to stop, but to no avail.

In the meantime, Akulya had washed off her frock, and she and Malasha returned to the pool.  The two girls make a small boat out of bark, and they make a stream from the puddle.  They go chasing after the boat together, as happy as ever.  Akulya's grandmother urges everyone to follow the example of the children, and take their spirit of forgiveness into their own hearts.

See also
Bibliography of Leo Tolstoy
Twenty-Three Tales

References

"The Works of Tolstoi."  Black's Readers Service Company: Roslyn, New York.  1928.

External links
 Complete Text, translated by Louise Maude and Aylmer Maude
 Little Girls Wiser Than Men, from RevoltLib
 Little Girls Wiser Than Men, from Marxists.org
 Other Complete Text Versions
 Wisdom of Children at The Literature Network

1885 short stories
Short stories by Leo Tolstoy
Parables